The Cleansing is the debut studio album by American deathcore band Suicide Silence. The album was released on September 18, 2007 through Century Media Records. Upon its release it debuted at #94 on the Billboard Top 200, selling 7,250 copies within the first week, and became one of the best-selling debut albums in Century Media's history.

The album is noted for its unique engineered style, as it was tracked live in-studio as opposed to being recorded track-by-track. The Cleansing was recorded at King Size Soundlabs in Los Angeles with engineer John Travis and was produced and mixed by Danish producer Tue Madsen.

Background 
Suicide Silence began recording The Cleansing during the first half of 2007 with engineer John Travis. On June 22, 2007 the complete track listing was confirmed online and the songs "Bludgeoned to Death" and "Unanswered" were released by the band via streaming media for promotion prior to the album's release. The entire album was recorded live.

The Cleansing was released on September 18, 2007 and debuted at #94 on the Billboard Top 200, selling 7,250 copies in the first week, and became one of the best-selling debut albums in Century Media history. The record was also released on vinyl format, with a limited pressing of 2,000 copies. Music videos have been released for the songs "Unanswered", "The Price of Beauty" and "Bludgeoned to Death". The music video for "The Price of Beauty" was banned from the MTV playlist for being deemed too "visually and lyrically explicit", as the theme of the video depicted graphic gore imagery revolving around a woman undergoing a facelift surgery, but having her face instead horribly dismembered and mutilated in the process.

The album cover artwork was designed by graphic artist Dave McKean. The opening track, "Revelations (Intro)" includes a sound sample from the film Freddy vs. Jason. The hidden track, "Destruction of a Statue" features guest vocals by Nate Johnson, former vocalist of the bands Through the Eyes of the Dead, Deadwater Drowning and Fit for an Autopsy.

Music videos
The videos were released for the songs "Unanswered", "The Price of Beauty", and "Bludgeoned to Death".

Track listing 

 Note: Except for "Swarm" and "The Fallen", all live tracks were previously released in 2009 on the Hot Topic Exclusive Edition of No Time to Bleed.

Personnel 

Suicide Silence
 Mitch Lucker – vocals
 Mark Heylmun – guitars
 Chris Garza – guitars
 Mike Bodkins – bass
 Alex Lopez – drums

Additional personnel 
 Nate Johnson - vocals during the climax on "Destruction of a Statue" 
Production and other stuff
 Recorded and engineered by John Travis at King Size Soundlabs, Los Angeles, CA 
 Sub-engineering by Richard Robinson 
 Produced, mixed and mastered by Tue Madsen at Antfarm Studio, Denmark
 Art illustration and design by Dave McKean

Charts

References 

2007 debut albums
Suicide Silence albums
Century Media Records albums
Albums produced by Tue Madsen
Albums with cover art by Dave McKean